Arindam Shibendranarayan Das (born 16 October 1981) is an Indian cricketer who plays for Bengal in domestic cricket. He is a right-hand opening batsman. In February 2001, Das played two ODIs for the India Under-19 cricket team against England Under-19 cricket team.

References

External links 

Indian cricketers
Bengal cricketers
East Zone cricketers
1981 births
Living people
Cricketers from Kolkata